Aris Tsachouridis (born 10 December 1940) is a former Greek professional footballer who played as a forward.

Club career
Tsachouridis started football at PAO Diikitirio and in 1959 he joined Makedonikos in Thessaloniki, where he played for a season before singing for AEK Athens in the summer of 1960.

With the yellow–blacks, he played for four seasons winning a championship in 1963 and a Greek Cup in 1964. He scored his first goal with the club on 27 November 1960 in a 4–2 home win over Ethnikos Piraeus, while on 26 April 1961 he scored his team's only goal in the 5–1 away defeat in the hands of Fenerbahçe. In the summer of 1964, Tsachouridis was transferred to Proodeftiki as an exchange for the acquisition of the defender, Fotis Balopoulos.

At Proodeftiki, he competed for 4 another four seasons in the first division He then played for two years at AO Koropi, winning the promotion in the second division in his first season and in the summer of 1970 he was released. He continued at Leonidas Sparta, where he ended his football career in the summer of 1971.

International career
Tsachouridis was an executive of the Greek military team and he won the World Military Cup in 1962 and 1963.

Tsachouridis appeared once with Greece in 1963. He did so on 22 May 1963 in a friendly 4–0 away defeat against Poland, under his former manager at AEK, Tryfon Tzanetis, he started the match beeing replaced by Leandros at half-time.

After football
Tsachouridis was the main scout and the opponent's tactical analyst for AEK Athens in the staff of Dušan Bajević in the late 80's and in the 90's. He is one of the founding members of the Veterans Association of AEK Athens and continuously participates in its events.

Honours

AEK Athens
Alpha Ethniki: 1962–63
Greek Cup: 1963–64

Greece military 
World Military Cup: 1962, 1963

References

1941 births
Living people
AEK Athens F.C. players
Proodeftiki F.C. players
Koropi F.C. players
Greece international footballers
Super League Greece players
Super League Greece 2 players
Association football forwards
Greek footballers